Sphecosoma meridionale is a moth in the subfamily Arctiinae. It was described by Schrottky in 1910. It is found in Paraguay.

References

Natural History Museum Lepidoptera generic names catalog

Moths described in 1910
Sphecosoma